Dan DiDio (born October 13, 1959) is an American writer, editor, and publisher who has worked in the television and comic book industries. From February 2010 until February 2020, he was the co-publisher of DC Comics, along with Jim Lee. Wizard magazine recognized him as its first ever "Man of the Year" in 2003 for his work in the DC Universe line of comics.

Career

TV work
Prior to joining DC Comics, DiDio worked in television, beginning in 1981. DiDio was a freelance writer and story editor for Mainframe Entertainment, specifically working on ReBoot and War Planets.

DC Comics
DiDio joined DC Comics in January 2002, as vice president–editorial, as well as writer for Superboy (issues #94 to 100). He was promoted to vice president–executive editor, DC Universe in October 2004. Since 2006, DiDio has written a weekly column called "DC Nation" which appears on the end page of most of DC Comics' main superhero titles. Originally, the column was tied to the yearlong weekly maxi-series 52, a project which he oversaw. On February 18, 2010, DC Entertainment President Diane Nelson named DiDio as co-publisher of DC Comics, along with Jim Lee.

Dan DiDio returned to writing comics with short stories for the 2008 and 2009 DC Halloween specials and the 2009 Holiday special. In 2009, he returned to regular writing duties with the weekly Metal Men feature in Wednesday Comics. In January 2010, DiDio wrote the Weird Western Tales tie-in issue of the Blackest Night crossover and took over regular monthly scripting of The Outsiders. As Co-Publisher, he oversaw the reboot of all current DC titles and was the co-writer of the OMAC series with artist Keith Giffen. DiDio wrote a Challengers of the Unknown storyline for DC Universe Presents which was drawn by Jerry Ordway.

In July 2012, as part of the San Diego Comic-Con, DiDio and DC co-publisher Jim Lee participated in the production of "Heroic Proportions", an episode of the Syfy reality television competition series Face Off, in which special effects makeup artists compete to create the best makeup according to each episode's theme. Lee and DiDio presented the contestants with that episode's challenge, to create a new superhero, with six DC Comics artists on hand to help them develop their ideas. The winning entry's character, Infernal Core by Anthony Kosar, was featured in Justice League Dark #16 (March 2013), which was published January 30, 2013. The episode premiered on January 22, 2013, as the second episode of the fourth season.

A Phantom Stranger ongoing series written by DiDio and drawn by Brent Anderson began in September 2012. DiDio and Keith Giffen reunited on Infinity Man and the Forever People in 2014. DiDio, Justin Jordan, and Kenneth Rocafort created the Sideways series as part of DC's "Dark Matter" line.

On February 21, 2020, DiDio stepped down as Co-Publisher of DC Comics after ten years at that position. The company did not give a reason for the move, nor did it indicate whether it was his decision or the company's, though it was the latest event in a restructuring that began the previous month, as several top executives were laid off from the company. However, Bleeding Cool reported that he was fired.

Frank Miller Presents
On April 28, 2022, it was officially announced that Dan DiDio would serve as publisher for Frank Miller's newly-announced comic book company Frank Miller Presents (FMP).

Inkwell Awards Special Ambassador
On August 23, 2002, Dan DiDio was officially announced as new Special Ambassador to the Inkwell Awards advocacy group.

Bibliography

Comics
 Adam Strange/Future Quest Special #1 (2017)
 Batman and the Outsiders vol. 2 #40 (2011)
 Batman Black and White vol. 2 #2 (2013)
 Batman Incorporated Special #1 (2013)
 DC Infinite Halloween Special #1 (2007)
 DC Universe Presents #6–8 (Challengers of the Unknown); #0 (OMAC) (2012)
 DCU Halloween Special #1 (2008)
 DCU Holiday Special #1 (2009)
 Infinity-Man and the Forever People #1–9 (2014–2015)
 Infinity-Man and the Forever People: Futures End #1 (2014)
 Justice League Dark # 23.1– 23.2 (2013)
 Justice League International Annual vol. 2 #1 (2012)
 Metal Men #1-12 (2019-2020)
 O.M.A.C. vol. 3 #1–8 (2011–2012)
 Outsiders vol. 4 #26–39 (2010–2011)
 Phantom Stranger vol. 4 #0, #1–8 (2012–2013)
 Sideways #1–13 (2018–2019)
 Superboy vol. 3 #94–100 (2002)
 Trinity of Sin: The Phantom Stranger: Futures End #1 (2014)
 Wednesday Comics #1–12 (Metal Men) (2009)
 Weird Western Tales #71 (2010)

Television
• series head writer denoted in bold
ReBoot (1997–1999): season 3
Shadow Raiders (1998–1999)

References

External links

 
 
 Dan DiDio at Mike's Amazing World of Comics

1959 births
American business executives
American comics writers
Comic book editors
Comic book publishers (people)
DC Comics people
Living people
American people of Italian descent